Truden im Naturpark is a comune (municipality) in South Tyrol in northern Italy, located about  south of the city of Bolzano. Until March 2008 it was called simply Truden.

Geography

Truden borders the following municipalities: Aldein, Altrei, Capriana, Carano, and Montan.

Frazioni
The municipality of Truden contains the frazioni (subdivisions, mainly villages and hamlets) Kltenbrunn (Fontanefredde), Mühlen (Molini di Trodena), and San Lugano.

History

Coat-of-arms
The shield is barry of four of argent and gules and represents the crosier and the martyrdom hook, both of or in saltire with two palm branches on each side and a mitre over all. The emblem, granted in 1930, represents the insignia of Saint Blaise the patron saint.

Society

Linguistic distribution
According to the 2011 census, 73.94% of the population speak German, 25.42% Italian and 0.64% Ladin as first language.

Demographic evolution

References

External links
 Homepage of the municipality

Municipalities of South Tyrol